Microwave Bypass, Inc. launched the world's first fixed wireless internet access technology in 1987, a decade before Wi-Fi. It enabled local and remote networks to connect at the then full Ethernet (802.3) data rate of 10 megabits per second, and for up to 4.3 miles.

The company was founded in March 1986 by David Theodore (25), operating from One Kendall Square, Cambridge, Massachusetts. Its wireless solution consisted of a modified broadcast quality video radio (23 GHz) coupled with Microwave Bypass' EtherWave Transceiver.  The system met the then highest Ethernet throughput and could transmit , in keeping with Ethernet's propagation delay allowance (46.4µs).

Beta testing occurred at Massachusetts General Hospital in March 1987, at the invitation of network manager, David Murphy, and with Network World's Laura DiDio and representatives of Harvard University and Boston University's Dr. Mikhail Orlov in attendance. This also marked the first wireless transmission of MR images.

In 1988, Microwave Bypass collaborated with Cisco Systems on a full-duplex EtherWave Transceiver to eliminate 802.3 collision detection and permit longer distance connections as far as the microwave could reach. This first full-duplex design was developed for an application at MIT, between its main campus and Lincoln Laboratories. Later that year Microwave Bypass completed an exclusive deal, announced by Motorola, for the transfer of its EtherWave Transceiver and LAN-LINK 1000 Bridge technologies.

Company Highlights

• Microwave Bypass' wireless tech brought the first internet access to greater Boston through a consortium led by MIT, Harvard and Boston University. The early, all wireless network, was called NEARnet, and included world leaders in education, health care and technology.

• Deployed a Smithsonian Award winning K-12 network for Desert Sands Unified School District (CA), designed an extensive backbone for the Space Shuttle Project (Edwards AFB), provided Interop with its first internet connection (1989), and installed the first residential Wi-Fi (fixed wireless), notably for Bill Joy co-founder of Sun Microsystems.

• Microwave Bypass was selected one of the top ten industry leaders by "LAN Times," in 1990  and was highly regarded by analysts, including the Aberdeen Group, which estimated the company's market share at 70%.

Notes

References 
 
 
 
 
 

 
 
 

1986 establishments in Massachusetts
American companies established in 1986